The list of songs written and performed by Avril Lavigne comprises original songs recorded by Canadian singer-songwriter Avril Lavigne for her studio albums, cover versions of songs by other artists performed by Lavigne, and original songs written by Lavigne that were recorded and released by other artists. Since her professional music career began in 2002, Lavigne has worked with a number of songwriters and producers.

After signing a record contract with Arista in November 2000 at age 16, Lavigne spent several months in New York working on songs for her debut album, Let Go, with several songwriters, including Sabelle Breer, Curt Frasca and Peter Zizzo. Unhappy with the direction the album was taking, Lavigne moved to Los Angeles in May 2001 and made a major breakthrough when she began working with American pop music writing and record producer trio The Matrix. Together, the four produced "Complicated", which would become Lavigne's first single and gain her international recognition, as well as two of the album's other singles, "Sk8er Boi" and "I'm with You". Overall, Lavigne produced six songs with The Matrix, five of which were included on the final album. She also worked with several other songwriters and producers, including Clif Magness.

For her second album, Under My Skin, released in 2004, Lavigne made no plans to work with professional writers. Instead, she wrote most of the album's songs with Canadian singer-songwriter Chantal Kreviazuk, with whom she had become friends the previous summer. The two spent nearly three weeks writing in the warehouse of Kreviazuk's husband, Raine Maida, the lead vocalist and songwriter for Our Lady Peace. Because Lavigne had no experience in production, Maida produced five of the album's songs. Lavigne also worked with two other producers: Don Gilmore, who worked on two tracks, and Butch Walker, who worked on three. Along with Kreviazuk, Lavigne wrote three songs with her former guitarist, Evan Taubenfeld, and one with Ben Moody.

Lavigne began recording her third album, The Best Damn Thing, in August 2006. She teamed with songwriter and producer Dr. Luke. Together they wrote the album's debut single, "Girlfriend", a fast-paced, pop-punk song. Lavigne also worked with her then-husband and Sum 41 singer Deryck Whibley, as well as with Butch Walker, who worked on two of the album's singles, and Evan Taubenfeld, who co-wrote four of the album's twelve songs.

Goodbye Lullaby, Lavigne's fourth studio album, was released in 2011. Lavigne began recording the album in 2008 at her home studio. The album's first track, "Black Star", was originally written by Lavigne as a jingle for the television commercial promoting her fragrance of the same name. She later expanded the song to include it on the album. In all, Lavigne wrote half of the album's fourteen tracks on her own. She also worked with Max Martin and Shellback, who co-wrote all three of the album's singles. She again wrote several songs with Evan Taubenfeld. Though he and Lavigne had been divorced in 2009, Deryck Whibley produced seven tracks on the album.

In addition to her original studio songs, Lavigne has also covered songs by other artists, both in live performances and on studio releases. Her first was "Knockin' On Heaven's Door" by Bob Dylan, which she first performed in 2003. She has also covered several songs on each of her four world tours, including Green Day's "Basket Case", Blink-182's "All the Small Things", and Coldplay's "Fix You". Lavigne has also written several songs that she gave to other artists, most notably "Breakaway", which was recorded by Kelly Clarkson and released on her second album of the same name.

Original songs
Avril Lavigne's original songs include those written and recorded by Lavigne and released on a studio album or on a single album. Lavigne has released seven studio albums and 32 singles.

Unreleased original songs
A number of songs written, recorded, and performed by Avril Lavigne have never been released. Many of these have been registered with professional music and copyright bodies, including the American Society of Composers, Authors and Publishers (ASCAP), Broadcast Music Incorporated (BMI), and the Harry Fox Agency. Several have also been acknowledged and discussed by Lavigne in interviews, or by other sources.

Cover songs and featured performances
Avril Lavigne has covered a number of songs during her career. Her first was a cover of Bob Dylan's "Knockin' On Heaven's Door", which she performed live at promotional appearances in early 2003 and on her Try To Shut Me Up Tour later that year. She has included cover songs on the set list of each of her four world tours, and has also sung several songs with their original performers, notably: "Iris" with Goo Goo Dolls frontman Johnny Rzeznik in 2004, "Ironic" with Alanis Morissette in 2005, and "Love Is a Battlefield" with Pat Benatar in 2011. Lavigne has also performed as a featured artist.

Because Lavigne has performed several covers many times, the year listed for each is the year in which she first performed or released it.

Original songs performed by other artists
Lavigne has written several songs that were later recorded and released by other artists. The most notable of these is  "Breakaway", which Lavigne wrote with Bridget Benenate and Matthew Gerrard for her debut album, Let Go. Lavigne ultimately decided against including the song because she felt it did not suit the album and sent the track to Kelly Clarkson, who recorded it in 2004 and included it on her second album. Lavigne's version of "I Will Be" was released on several editions of her third album, The Best Damn Thing, before it was given to Leona Lewis, who recorded a version for her own album.

The song "Daydream" was originally intended for Lavigne, but she offered it to Demi Lovato, who did not accept the offer but did perform it on her "Warm Up" Tour. The song later appeared on the album Sparks Fly by Miranda Cosgrove.

See also
 Avril Lavigne discography

References

External links
 Avril Lavigne's official website

 
Lavigne, Avril